The Seoul Capital Area (SCA), Sudogwon or Gyeonggi region, is the metropolitan area of Seoul, Incheon, and Gyeonggi Province, located in north-west South Korea. Its population of 26 million (as of 2020) is ranked as the fourth largest metropolitan area in the world. It forms the cultural, commercial, financial, industrial, and residential center of South Korea. The largest city is Seoul, with a population of approximately 10 million people, followed by Incheon, with 3 million inhabitants.

Geography and climate

The Capital Area occupies a plain in the Han River valley. It contains some of the most fertile land on the Korean peninsula, although relatively little of it is now used for agriculture. The Gimpo international airport, one of the country's larger expanses of level arable land, covers much of the area of the cities of Gimpo and Bucheon.

History

The Capital Area has been home to a Korean capital for around 2,000 years. Its central location and relatively gentle landscape have given it a central role in the country's affairs.

The first capital to be constructed in the region was that of Baekje, one of the Three Kingdoms of Korea.  The country's first capital was built in 19 BC and was named Wiryeseong.  This is believed to have been constructed near the modern-day boundary of Seoul and Gwangju City.  However, Baekje was unable to hold this territory, and surrendered the Han River valley to Goguryeo in the 5th century.  The land was then taken over by Silla in the 6th century, at which point it came to play a critical role in helping Silla to establish ties with China.

After the fall of Silla, Taejo of Goryeo established the capital of his kingdom in Kaesŏng, now just north of the Demilitarized Zone.  During the Mongol invasions of Korea in the 12th century, the seat of government briefly shifted to Ganghwa Island, now just south of the DMZ in Incheon metropolitan city, where the Mongol naval attacks were repelled for about a decade before the king voluntarily surrendered to stop the carnage the Mongols committed in the peninsula, in order to lure the king out.

Hanyang was chosen to be the new capital for mountains surrounding it making it safe from enemies, and for the Han River, separating the north and south parts of the city that let the trade business flourish. During the new dynasty's rule, extensive road systems, administrative buildings, royal palaces, and new ports were built, quickly attracting wealth from all over the kingdom. During the Korean Empire period, Hanseong's public transportation was improved with the installation of streetcars and manually drawn trolleys similar to taxis. Horse carriage systems similar to the ones in Europe were also established.

Following the Japanese occupation of Korea in 1910, Hanseong was renamed Keijo (Gyeongseong) and served as Korea's capital. The Korean Republic with its war of resistance against Japan also named it as its capital. Upon Japan's defeat and Korea's liberation in 1945, the capital retained one of its old names, Seoul and became capital of South Korea.

In the Korean War (1950–1953), the Capital Area became the focus of battles so destructive that most of Seoul and the surrounding regions were eradicated. Seoul was especially hit hard, since it exchanged hands four times during the course of the war.

During the latter half of the 20th century, the Capital Area began to rapidly develop as South Korea's economic wealth expanded. Population expanded fourfold since the Korean War. In 2001, the new Incheon International Airport took over all international flights to Seoul.

Demographics

Covering only about 12% of the country's area, the Seoul Capital Area is home to more than 48.2% of the national population, and is the world's ninth largest urban area. This percentage has risen steadily since the mid-20th century, and the trend is expected to continue. Currently more than half of the people who move from one region to another are moving to the capital area. By 2020, it is projected that more than 52% of South Korea's population will live within the area, or 26,310,000 people. However, the Seoul Capital Area reached 25,620,000 people by 2015, bringing the chance of reaching a population of 26.31 Million in less than 5 years.

Economy
In 2017, Seoul Capital Area's gross regional product was ₩870 trillion(US$770 billion), generating half of the country's total GDP. It is the fourth largest urban economy in the world after Tokyo, New York City and Los Angeles, and the region hosts headquarters of 59 Forbes Global 2000 companies.
As the economy of Seoul Capital Area transformed to knowledge economy from the manufacturing-based economy of the 20th century, there are a number of high-tech business parks in Seoul Capital Area, such as Digital Media City and Pangyo Techno Valley.

The South Korean government is now implementing a plan to create several centers for economic activities in the Capital Area. According to the plan, for example, Seoul is a 'Northeast Asia's Financial and Business Hub', and southwestern coast, with Incheon and Suwon, is 'International logistics and High-tech Industrial Belt'.

The Seoul Capital Area is home to the most affluent and livable cities and apartments in Korea but there are significant discrepancies between cities and districts, particularly between those built in the older and newer generations. Newer areas with more modern and luxurious apartments and infrastructure are more expensive, along with proximity to Gangnam District, the commercial center of the region.

Government

Various agencies have been set up to deal with the intergovernmental problems of the region. Proposals for consolidating some or all of the cities of the capital area into a handful of metropolitan cities have thus far not been implemented.

Development in the area is currently governed by the Capital Region Readjustment Planning Act (수도권정비계획법), first passed in 1982 and last revised in 1996.

Subdivisions

The Seoul Capital Area is divided among the special city of Seoul, the metropolitan city of Incheon, and province of Gyeonggi. Seoul has 25 gu (local government wards), Incheon has 8 gu and 2 counties, and Gyeonggi Province has 28 cities and 3 counties as the subdivisions.

Seoul

The 25 districts of Seoul.

Dobong District (도봉구; 道峰區)
Dongdaemun District (동대문구; 東大門區)
Dongjak District (동작구; 銅雀區)
Eunpyeong District (은평구; 恩平區)
Gangbuk District (강북구; 江北區)
Gangdong District (강동구; 江東區)
Gangnam District (강남구; 江南區)
Gangseo District (강서구; 江西區)
Geumcheon District (금천구; 衿川區)
Guro District (구로구; 九老區)
Gwanak District (관악구; 冠岳區)
Gwangjin District (광진구; 廣津區)
Jongno District (종로구; 鍾路區)
Jung District (중구; 中區)
Jungnang District (중랑구; 中浪區)
Mapo District (마포구; 麻浦區)
Nowon District (노원구; 蘆原區)
Seocho District (서초구; 瑞草區)
Seodaemun District (서대문구; 西大門區)
Seongbuk District (성북구; 城北區)
Seongdong District (성동구; 城東區)
Songpa District (송파구; 松坡區)
Yangcheon District (양천구; 陽川區)
Yeongdeungpo District (영등포구; 永登浦區)
Yongsan District (용산구; 龍山區)

Incheon

The 8 districts and 2 counties of Incheon.

 Bupyeong District (부평구; 富平區)
 Dong District (동구; 東區)
 Gyeyang District (계양구; 桂陽區)
 Jung District (중구; 中區)
 Michuhol District (미추홀구; 彌鄒忽區) (Former Nam District; 남구 南區)
 Namdong District (남동구; 南洞區)
 Seo District (서구; 西區)
 Yeonsu District (연수구; 延壽區)

 Ganghwa County (강화군; 江華郡)
 Ongjin County (옹진군; 甕津郡)

Gyeonggi-do

27 cities and 4 counties of Gyeonggi-do. Below are seven of the largest cities, sorted by their population size:

Suwon

The 4 gu of Suwon (수원; 水原).

 Paldal-gu (팔달구; 八達區)
 Yeongtong-gu (영통구; 霊通區)
 Jangan-gu (장안구; 長安區)
 Gwonseon-gu (권선구; 勸善區)

Goyang

The 3 gu of Goyang (고양; 高陽).

 Deogyang-gu (덕양구; 德陽區)
 Ilsandong-gu (일산동구; 一山東區)
 Ilsanseo-gu (일산서구; 一山西區)

Yongin

The 3 gu of Yongin (용인; 龍仁).

 Cheoin-gu (처인구; 處仁區)
 Giheung-gu (기흥구; 器興區)
 Suji-gu (수지구; 水枝區)

Seongnam

The 3 gu of Seongnam (성남; 城南).

 Bundang-gu (분당구; 盆唐區)
 Jungwon-gu (중원구; 中原區)
 Sujeong-gu (수정구; 壽井區)

Bucheon

Ansan

The 2 gu of Ansan (안산; 安山).

 Danwon-gu (단원구; 檀園區)
 Sangnok-gu (상록구; 常綠區)

Anyang

The 2 gu of Anyang (안양; 安養).

 Dongan-gu (동안구; 東安區)
 Manan-gu (만안구; 萬安區)

Anseong (안성; 安城)
Dongducheon (동두천; 東豆川)
Gimpo (김포; 金浦)
Goyang (고양; 高陽)
Gunpo (군포; 軍浦)
Guri (구리; 九里)
Gwacheon (과천; 果川)

Gwangju (광주; 廣州)
Gwangmyeong (광명; 光明)
Hanam (하남; 河南)
Hwaseong (화성; 華城)
Icheon (이천; 利川)
Namyangju (남양주; 南楊州)
Osan (오산; 烏山)

Paju (파주; 坡州)
Pocheon (포천; 抱川)
Pyeongtaek (평택; 平澤)
Siheung (시흥; 始興)
Uijeongbu (의정부; 議政府)
Uiwang (의왕; 儀旺)
Yangju (양주; 楊州)

Yeoju (여주; 驪州)
Gapyeong County (가평군; 加平郡)
Yangpyeong County (양평군; 揚平郡)
Yeoncheon County (연천군; 漣川郡)

Transportation 

The cities of the capital area are tightly interconnected by road and rail. Many of the country's railroad lines, most notably the Gyeongbu Line, terminate in the region. In addition, rapid transit is provided by the Seoul Metropolitan Subway, which has lines that serve all districts of Seoul, as well as the city of Incheon and other surrounding cities within Gyeonggi Province.

The region is a nexus for travel by air and water. The country's two largest airports, Incheon International Airport and Gimpo International Airport, are in the metropolitan area.  International and domestic ferries depart from Incheon's ferry terminals several times a day. Massive volumes of international freight pass through the container terminals of Incheon (primarily bound to and from China).

Seoul Ring Expressway (Expressway No. 100) connects satellite cities around Seoul:  Ilsan, Toegyewon, Hanam, Pyeongchon, Songnae, Bundang, Pangyo and Gimpo.

See also
 Geography of South Korea
 Regions of Korea 
 Demographics of South Korea
 Capital Region
 List of metropolitan areas by population
 List of metropolitan areas in Asia by population
 Subdivisions of South Korea
 Seoul Ring Expressway
 Greater Tokyo Area
 Jing-Jin-Ji

Notes

External links 
  Official website of Seoul Metropolitan government 
 Metropolitan Air Quality Management Office, in Korean
 Capital Region Development Institute, in Korean
 Chosun Ilbo metro news, in Korean